The prime minister of Pakistan is the popularly elected politician who is the chief executive of the Government of Pakistan. The prime minister is vested with the responsibility of running the administration through his appointed federal cabinet, formulating national policies to ensure the safeguard of the interests of the nation and its people through the Council of Common Interests as well as making the decision to call nationwide general elections for the bicameral Parliament of Pakistan.

Since 1947, Pakistan has had eighteen prime ministers, aside from the appointed caretaker prime ministers who were only mandated to oversee the system until the election process was finished. In Pakistan's parliamentary system, the prime minister is sworn in by the president and usually is the chairman or the president of the party or coalition that has a majority in the National Assembly– the lower house of Pakistan Parliament.

After the partition of British India on the midnight of 14/15 August 1947, Pakistan followed the British system by creating the post of prime minister based at the Prime Minister's Secretariat. The then governor-general of Pakistan, Muhammad Ali Jinnah, took advice from the Founding Fathers of the nation and appointed Liaquat Ali Khan to establish and lead his administration on 15 August 1947. Before the presidential system in 1960, seven prime ministers had served between 1947 until martial law in 1958. In 1971, the office was again revived but ceased to exist shortly. Executive powers and authority was given to the prime minister when the full set of the Constitution of Pakistan was promulgated in 1973 but the post was ceased from its effective operations after another martial law in 1977. After the general elections held in 1985, the office came to its existence. Between 1988 and 1999, the office was held by Benazir Bhutto of the PPP and Nawaz Sharif of PML(N), each holding the office for two non-consecutive terms between 1988 and 1999: Bhutto during 1988–90 and 1993–96; and Sharif during 1990–93 and 1997–99.

After the general elections held in 2002, Zafarullah Khan Jamali was invited to form his administration as its prime minister. After the Supreme Court of Pakistan's ruling to disqualify Prime Minister Yousaf Raza Gillani in 2012, the business of his administration was looked after by Raja Pervez Ashraf until the caretaker administration was setup under Mir Hazar Khan Khoso.

Nurul Amin of the Muslim League had the shortest term, at 13 days. Yousaf Raza Gilani of PPP had the longest consecutive term of 4 years and 86 days. At approximately 9 years and 215 days in total, Nawaz Sharif of PML (N) has been the longest-serving prime minister for a non-consecutive term. Sharif was re-elected for a third non-consecutive term on 5 June 2013, which is a record in the history of Pakistan. No prime minister of Pakistan has yet served their full five year term.

The national politics in Pakistan was mostly dominated by the army department of the Pakistan Armed Forces throughout its history, but it is now dominated by the political parties.

Key

Prime ministers

Timeline

Caretakers

Notes

References

External links

Pakistan
Prime Ministers
!